The Australian Fleet Air Arm Museum, formerly known as Australia's Museum of Flight, is a military aerospace museum located at the naval air station , near Nowra, New South Wales. The museum was opened in 1990, although efforts to preserve artifacts related to Australia's naval aviation history began in 1974. The museum houses aircraft used throughout the history of the Fleet Air Arm, the naval aviation branch of the Royal Australian Navy (RAN), along with other aircraft of relevance to Australia's aviation history, and memorabilia relating to Australian aircraft carriers. The museum includes 34 aircraft and helicopters in its collection. It is open to the public daily, except for major public holidays. The museum building is also home to Albatross Aero Club.

History
The Fleet Air Arm Museum can trace its origins to 1974 when a group of volunteers associated with the Royal Australian Navy (RAN) obtained five obsolete RAN aircraft and began work to establish a museum for display of artifacts to present the story of Australian Naval aviation. $80m were raised from various sources for a large hangar and function centre. In 1990, the Australian Naval Aviation Museum Foundation was established to operate the museum.

In 2000, the museum was renamed Australia's Museum of Flight and its role expanded to displaying artifacts related to Australian aviation. In 2006, ownership and management of the museum were handed to the Royal Australian Navy and it was renamed the Fleet Air Arm Museum.

The museum now displays more than 34 aircraft and many aviation artifacts.

Displays
The following exhibits are on static display in the museum:

Aircraft
Aermacchi MB-326H
Auster J5G (stored)
CAC CA-22 Winjeel prototype
de Havilland Sea Vampire T22
de Havilland Sea Venom F.A.W. Mk 53
Douglas C-47 Dakota
Fairey Firefly AS.5/AS.6
Fairey Gannet AS1/4
Fairey Gannet T.2/T.5
Grumman S-2E/G Tracker - 2 x S-2E (static), 1 x S-2G (flyable)
GAF Jindivik - pilotless target aircraft
Hawker Sea Fury Mk 11
McDonnell Douglas A-4G Skyhawk
McDonnell Douglas TA-4G Skyhawk
Mikoyan-Gurevich MiG-15 UTI
N28 Kalkara target aircraft
Sopwith Pup
Supermarine Sea Otter

Helicopters
Aérospatiale AS350 Squirrel
Bell 47G-3B1 Sioux
Bell UH-1C Iroquois
Bell UH-1H Iroquois
Bristol Sycamore HR 50/51
Sikorsky S-55
Sikorsky S-70B-2 Seahawk
Westland Dragonfly
Westland Scout AH-1
Westland Sea King Mk50
Westland Wessex Mk31B
Westland Whirlwind

See also
Royal Australian Navy Heritage Centre
Royal Navy Fleet Air Arm Museum
List of aerospace museums

Notes

External links

 Fleet Air Arm Museum website

Aerospace museums in Australia
Transport museums in New South Wales
Naval museums
Military and war museums in Australia
Aviation in New South Wales
1990 establishments in Australia